Muhammad Ahmed Al-Banki (1963-2010) was a Bahraini philosopher and writer and a key postmodern in the region in the 1990s. Once an Under-Secretary at the Ministry of Culture and Information, he died on April 28, 2010.

Career
Al-Banki graduated from the College of Arts of the University of Bahrain in 1990, when he began editing the culture column of the local newspaper Al Ayam. Afte ra short time there, he returned to his alma mater to serve as director of its Department of Public Relations and Media. While working there, he edited a series of literary and critical periodicals, ultimately leading to a post as Editor-in-Chief of Al-Watan.

Al-Banki worked briefly as an advisor to Minister of Culture Mai bint Mohammed Al Khalifa. He was appointed Under-Secretary in 2008 and served as such until his death in 2010.

Publications
 عبد الله الغذامي والممارسة النقدية والثقافية ("Abdullah Al Ghadami and the Practice of Cultural Criticism"), Arab Institute for Research & Publishing, 2003
 دريدا عربياً: قراءة التفكيك في الفكر النقدي العربي ("Derrida in the Arab World: Reading Deconstruction in Arab Critical Thought"), 2005
 الرواية والمدينة ("The Novel and the City"), Supreme Council of Culture of Egypt, 2008
 الرواية والتاريخ ("The Novel and History"), 2008

References

1963 births
2010 deaths 
Academic staff of the University of Bahrain